

432001–432100 

|-bgcolor=#f2f2f2
| colspan=4 align=center | 
|}

432101–432200 

|-
| 432101 Ngari ||  || Ngari (occasionally spelled as Ali), a prefecture in northwest Tibet. It is nicknamed "the top of the roof of the world" as most of the region is over 4500 m above sea level. || 
|}

432201–432300 

|-bgcolor=#f2f2f2
| colspan=4 align=center | 
|}

432301–432400 

|-id=361
| 432361 Rakovski ||  || Georgi Rakovski (1821–1867), a Bulgarian revolutionary and writer and an important figure of the Bulgarian National Revival and resistance against Ottoman rule || 
|}

432401–432500 

|-bgcolor=#f2f2f2
| colspan=4 align=center | 
|}

432501–432600 

|-bgcolor=#f2f2f2
| colspan=4 align=center | 
|}

432601–432700 

|-bgcolor=#f2f2f2
| colspan=4 align=center | 
|}

432701–432800 

|-bgcolor=#f2f2f2
| colspan=4 align=center | 
|}

432801–432900 

|-bgcolor=#f2f2f2
| colspan=4 align=center | 
|}

432901–433000 

|-id=971
| 432971 Loving ||  || Mildred (1939–2008) and Richard Loving (1933–1975) married in spite of anti-miscegenation laws. They filed the lawsuit Loving v. Virginia that ultimately succeeded in striking the laws down following a United States Supreme Court ruling in 1967. || 
|}

References 

432001-433000